The Clay County Courthouse in Vermillion, South Dakota is a Classical Revival-style courthouse built in 1913.  It was listed on the National Register of Historic Places in 1983.

It is a two-and-a-half-story building with stone veneer, on a raised basement.

References

Courthouses on the National Register of Historic Places in South Dakota
Neoclassical architecture in South Dakota
Government buildings completed in 1913
Clay County, South Dakota